This is a list of Administrators (with executive authority over the territory and its European populations) and Mendoubs (representatives of the Sultan of Morocco, with authority over the Muslim and Jewish communities) of the Tangier International Zone.

Administrators

(Dates in italics indicate de facto continuation of office)

Mendoubs

See also
 Tangier International Zone
 Mendoubia

External links
World Statesmen – Morocco (Tangier)

History of Tangier
Tangier International Zone
Tangier International Zone